Washington College is a private liberal arts college in Chestertown, Maryland, which is on the Eastern Shore of Maryland. The college was founded in 1782 by William Smith, but is the successor institution to the earlier Kent County Free School, which was founded in 1732. From the college's founding until 1922 the executive officer of the college was known as the principal of the college; subsequently, the executive officer is the president of the college. While the title changed, the office is considered to be the same and officeholders who were referred to as principals by their contemporaries are now referred to as presidents. Before the title change in 1922, the president of Washington College was the president of the Board of Visitors and Governors; since 1922, that position is the chair of the Board of Visitors and Governors.

The president of Washington College is appointed by the Board of Visitors and Governors and serves at the pleasure of the board. They are the chief executive officer and chief spokesperson of the college. As a part of their role, they are a voting member of the college's faculty and ex officio  member of the Board of Visitors and Governors. There is no fixed compensation or pay scale for the position; each president negotiates a contract independently with the board. As a part of the position's compensation, the President of Washington College is given access to the Hynson-Ringgold House, which has been the official residence of the Washington College president since 1944.

At least 31 people have been the president of Washington College since 1782, four of whom have been interim presidents. Of the 31 presidents only one, Joseph McLain, was an alumnus of the college and only one, Sheila Bair, was a woman. The presidents of the college have been drawn from a variety of areas including religion, military service, governmental service, and academia. Six Washington College presidents were ordained in the Episcopal Church or the Methodist Protestant Church before their term. Several were also the rector of Emanuel Parish in Chestertown concurrent to their term as president. Washington College presidents have come from many parts of public life. Two were engaged in military service before their term and four were in public service. A singular president, Kurt M. Landgraf, was working in the private sector before his term. Most of the remaining presidents were academics before becoming president of the college. Three were presidents of other colleges, eight were academic administrators, five were faculty members at other colleges, and three were faculty members at Washington College before their terms.

Principals and presidents of Washington College
 A "–" indicates that the individual served as Interim President.

Timeline

References

Notes

Citations

Bibliography

External links
 List of presidents on the College's Website 

Washington College
Washington College